Idan Weitzman (Hebrew:עידן ויצמן ;born April 20, 1985) is an Israeli footballer.

Simurq
In August 2013 Weitzman joined Azerbaijan Premier League side Simurq from Bnei Sakhnin. Weitzman became the first Israeli to appear in the Azerbaijan Premier League when he made his debut on 21 September 2013, coming on as a 52nd-minute substitute for Dilaver Zrnanović, in their 0-0 away draw against Qarabağ.

Career statistics

References

External links

Idan Weitzman - Walla! Sport
Idan Weitzman - Hapoel Haifa

1985 births
Living people
Israeli Jews
Israeli footballers
Footballers from Nesher
Maccabi Ironi Kiryat Ata F.C. players
Hapoel Acre F.C. players
Hapoel Nof HaGalil F.C. players
Hakoah Maccabi Amidar Ramat Gan F.C. players
F.C. Ashdod players
Hapoel Haifa F.C. players
Bnei Sakhnin F.C. players
Simurq PIK players
Hapoel Afula F.C. players
Ironi Tiberias F.C. players
F.C. Haifa Robi Shapira players
Hapoel Migdal HaEmek F.C. players
Shimshon Kafr Qasim F.C. players
Hapoel Tirat HaCarmel F.C. players
Beitar Tel Aviv Bat Yam F.C. players
Liga Leumit players
Israeli Premier League players
Azerbaijan Premier League players
Israeli expatriate footballers
Expatriate footballers in Azerbaijan
Israeli expatriate sportspeople in Azerbaijan
Israeli people of Moroccan-Jewish descent
Ironi Tiberias F.C. managers
Association football midfielders
Association football defenders